Robert, Robbie or Bob Brady may refer to:

 Robert Brady (criminal) (1904–1934), American bank robber and Depression-era outlaw
 Robert Brady (writer) (1627–1700), English historian and physician
 Robert A. Brady (1901–1963), American economist
 Robert David Brady (born 1946), American modernist sculptor
 Robert W. Brady (1825–1891), American Catholic priest and educator
 Robbie Brady (born 1992), Irish football player
 Bob Brady (born 1945), United States congressman
 Bob Brady (baseball) (1922–1996), Major League Baseball player
 Bob Brady (Canadian football) (1931–2018), Canadian football player

See also 
 List of The Brady Bunch characters, for Bobby Brady